Gaspare Conturla (died 1640) was a Roman Catholic prelate who served as Bishop of Venosa (1638–1640).

Biography
On 15 January 1638, Gaspare Conturla was appointed during the papacy of Pope Urban VIII as Bishop of Venosa.
On 24 January 1638, he was consecrated bishop by Francesco Maria Brancaccio, Cardinal-Priest of Santi XII Apostoli, with Alfonso Gonzaga, Titular Archbishop of Rhodus, and Biago Proto de Rubeis, Archbishop of Messina, serving as co-consecrators. 
He served as Bishop of Venosa until his death in 1640.

References

External links and additional sources
 (for Chronology of Bishops) 
 (for Chronology of Bishops) 

17th-century Italian Roman Catholic bishops
Bishops appointed by Pope Urban VIII
1640 deaths